Andru Bemis is an American musician from New Mexico, currently living in Binghamton, New York.

Life 
He performs on the banjo, violin, guitar and banjo-ukulele (which he calls a "banjolele"). Bemis lives a minimalist lifestyle, and is known for his engaging live shows throughout the United States. He tours primarily by train, public transportation, and hitchhiking.

Bemis has released three solo albums: "Plays Past His Bedtime" (2002), "Singer" (2004), and "Rail To Reel" (2006). He has collaborated on albums with Jason Webley, Trent Wagler & Jay Lapp, Rachel Ries, and Elisabeth Pixley-Fink.

For six years starting in 2007, Bemis operated Foundry Hall, a non-profit, all-ages community center and performance venue in South Haven, Michigan.

Bemis hosts the radio show Chenango Sessions.

Discography
 Plays Past His Bedtime (2002)
 Singer (2004)
 Rail To Reel (2006)

Collaborations
 How Big Is Tacoma (EP with Jason Webley) (2006)
 Say Yes To Yourself (EP with Elisabeth Pixley-Fink) (2011)

Other Appearances
 For You Only (Rachel Ries, Waterbug Records – vocals, banjo, guitar, recording engineer) (2005)
 Adrienna Valentine (Trent Wagler & Jay Lapp – vocals, banjo) (2007)

References

External links 
 AndruBemis.com
 Wepecket Island Records

Living people
Folk musicians from New Mexico
1978 births
People from Carlsbad, New Mexico
People from South Haven, Michigan